Demi-Centennial is a 1995 studio album by American jazz singer Rosemary Clooney.

Track listing
 "Danny Boy" (Frederick Weatherly) – 3:07
 "The Coffee Song" (Bob Hilliard, Dick Miles) – 2:47
 "(I'm) Confessin' (That I Love You)" (Doc Daugherty, Al J. Neiburg, Ellis Reynolds) – 4:31
 "I Left My Heart in San Francisco" (George Cory, Douglass Cross) – 3:50
 "Old Friends" (Stephen Sondheim) – 4:59
 "White Christmas" (Irving Berlin) – 3:16
 "There Will Never Be Another You" (Mack Gordon, Harry Warren) – 3:24
 "Falling in Love Again (Can't Help It)" (Frederick Hollander, Sammy Lerner) – 2:35
 "Sophisticated Lady" (Duke Ellington, Irving Mills, Mitchell Parish) – 3:40
 "How Will I Remember You" (Walter Gross, Carl Sigman) – 4:16
 "Mambo Italiano" (Bob Merrill) – 2:35
 "The Promise (I'll Never Say Goodbye)" (Alan Bergman, Marilyn Bergman) – 4:09
 "Heart's Desire" (Alan Broadbent, Dave Frishberg) - 4:06
 "We'll Meet Again" (Ross Parker, Hughie Charles) – 4:15
 "Time Flies" (Jimmy Webb) – 3:36
 "Dear Departed Past" (Dave Frishberg) – 6:25

Personnel

Performance
 Rosemary Clooney – vocal
 John Oddo – arranger, conductor

References

1995 albums
Rosemary Clooney albums
Concord Records albums